The Sedgwick Avenue station was an elevated, ground level and underground station on the Bronx extension of the IRT Ninth Avenue Line in Highbridge, Bronx, New York City.

History 
The station was built to connect to the New York & Putnam Railroad (in later decades, the 'Putnam Division') passenger trains that terminated there instead of the former 155th Street terminal and New York Central Railroad Hudson Division trains that stopped at the new (1918) platforms at this location. The station opened on July 1, 1918, and remained in use by the Polo Grounds Shuttle until 1958. The Putnam Division of the New York Central also ended service in 1958.

Station layout 
The station was built extending from the tunnel entrance to Jerome Avenue on the side of a cliff on a steel structure spanning the tracks of Metro-North's Hudson Line that connected to the existing Putnam Bridge, which had been built for the New York City and Northern Railroad. The station street entrance and mezzanine was above the tracks on Sedgwick Avenue. The west end of the platforms on the steel structure were constructed of wood. The east end of the concrete platforms extended into the tunnel for about a car length. A connecting passageway and stairways from the west end of the northbound platform led to the platforms on the New York Central Hudson Division tracks to permit transfers to that division's trains. The station site, in 2010, has ruins of the platforms and the track-bed into the tunnel entrance on Sedgwick Avenue. In late 2022, the station was filled in and sealed off as part of the I-87 reconstruction project.

The tunnel from Sedgwick Avenue to Anderson–Jerome Avenues was built to NYC Elevated Railway standards. Those standards specified the clearance between the tracks and the sides of the tunnel only allowed for the "El" type open third rail instead of the covered third rail in use on the IRT Subway. The standard distance from the center of the track to the center of the El type open third rail-head is a few inches shorter than the distance to the subway type covered third rail-head. This incompatibility prevented the line from being used in the future by standard IRT Subway equipment, and brought about the line's demise instead of being linked to the IRT Jerome Avenue Line at 167th Street in The Bronx and the IRT Lenox Avenue Line at Harlem–148th Street in Manhattan, which had been proposed by the New York City Board of Transportation in 1940. A footbridge to West 161st Street remains.

Gallery

References

External links
 
 Sedgwick Avenue station photos, diagrams and tour guide, by Joseph Brennan, 2002

IRT Ninth Avenue Line stations
Railway stations in the United States opened in 1918
1918 establishments in New York City
Railway stations closed in 1958
1958 disestablishments in New York (state)
Former elevated and subway stations in the Bronx